The Daja Hydroelectric Power Station ( or Daja kraftstasjon) is a hydroelectric power station in the municipality of Fauske in Nordland county, Norway.

The level of Kjelvatnet is regulated with water from two other lakes: Balvatnet and Big Lake Dorro. Nedre Daja is too small a body of water to rely on, and so electricity production must be coordinated with the Fagerli Hydroelectric Power Station, which utilizes the drop from Nedre Daja to Langvatnet (Long Lake).

The plant was built in 1958 by Balmi Kraftlag with Sulitjelma Mines as the main shareholder at 60%; Salten Kraftsamband (SKS) later acquired 40%. In 1983 the mining operations came under state ownership together with ownership of the watercourse. SKS operated the plant on behalf of the state until 1997, when it was able to buy the state's stake in the plant. Due to the former mining operations in Sulitjelma and the hope for new operations, there is still a clause for up to 30 GWh/year to be used at cost by any new mining operation.

See also

 Fagerli Hydroelectric Power Station

References

Hydroelectric power stations in Norway
Fauske
Energy infrastructure completed in 1958
1958 establishments in Norway